Mill Township may refer to the following townships in the United States:

 Mill Township, Tuscarawas County, Ohio
 Mill Township, Grant County, Indiana

See also 
 Mills Township (disambiguation)